is a Japanese manga written and illustrated by Daiju Yamauchi. It was adapted into a live action film in 2014.

Characters
Gen Shimura (Taiko Katono)
Makoto (Kōki Maeda)
Jimmy (Yōsuke Kawamura)
Mattsun (Ryōji Nakamura)

References

External links

2003 manga
Akita Shoten manga
Live-action films based on manga
Manga adapted into films
Seinen manga
Japanese romantic drama films